Strikeforce/M-1 Global: Fedor vs. Bigfoot was a mixed martial arts event promoted by Strikeforce in association with M-1 Global. It took place on February 12, 2011 at the Izod Center in East Rutherford, New Jersey. The main card of this event was broadcast live on Showtime, while the preliminary card was broadcast live on HDNet.

Background
This event marked the beginning of the eight-man Strikeforce World Grand Prix Heavyweight Tournament.

The three non-tournament heavyweight bouts on the main card served as tournament reserve bouts, to find alternates in case of any injuries or withdrawals from the tournament. The Del Rosario-Johnson winner was considered the first alternate, followed by the winners of the Overeem-Sefo and Griggs-Villante bouts. The winning alternate fighters were scheduled into two more alternate bouts at Strikeforce: Overeem vs. Werdum that June, with Del Rosario slotted to face undefeated prospect Daniel Cormier for the first alternate slot, and Overeem vs. Griggs for the second, though Del Rosario was replaced by Jeff Monson after a May car accident.

Andrei Arlovski was expected to face Josh Barnett, but Arlovski ended up fighting Sergei Kharitonov.

The event drew a record number of viewers for Strikeforce on Showtime with an average of 741,000 viewers.

Results

Heavyweight Grand Prix Bracket

** = Replacement

References

Fedor vs. Silva
M-1 Global events
2011 in mixed martial arts
Mixed martial arts in New Jersey
Events in East Rutherford, New Jersey
Sports competitions in East Rutherford, New Jersey
February 2011 sports events in the United States
2011 in sports in New Jersey